Thomas Neel (died 1410) of Chichester, Sussex, was an English politician.

He was a Member (MP) of the Parliament of England for Chichester in 1406 and 1407.

References

14th-century births
1410 deaths
English MPs 1406
People from Chichester
English MPs 1407